Cremorne is a locality in the Mackay Region, Queensland, Australia.

Geography 

Cremorne is on the northern bank of the Pioneer River in the centre of Mackay. The Forgan Smith Bridge crosses from central Mackay over the Pioneer River and through Cremorne to North Mackay. The Pioneer River forms the southern boundary of the locality and Barnes Creek forms the northern boundary. Most of the western part of the locality is parkland (largely undeveloped); there is a small number of industrial buildings around the Forgan Smith Bridge.

History 

Arriving in 1863, John Greenwood Barnes was the first settler on the northern band of the Pioneer River. He experimented with growing edible tropical plants such as breadfruit, mango, guava, pineapples etc. on behalf of botanist Ferdinand von Mueller, the curator of the Melbourne Botanic Gardens. However his greatest success was with coconut palms which he first planted in 1868 and then expanded to a plantation of 1200 trees.

In 1884, Barnes erected a two-storey hotel with a promenade roof. Working with his father-in-law William Seaward, he developed pleasure gardens called Cremorne Gardens thought to be modelled on the Cremorne Gardens in Melbourne (Barnes had lived in Victoria before moving to Queensland). In January 1898 the hotel was damaged by Cyclone Eline and then demolished by the January 1918 cyclone.

References

External links 

Mackay Region
Localities in Queensland